Sam Weller may refer to:
 Sam Weller (character), fictional character in The Pickwick Papers by Charles Dickens
 Sam Weller (journalist) (born 1967), American journalist and author
 Sam Weller (racehorse), competitor who failed to finish in the 1842 Grand National
 Sam Weller (cricketer) (born 1994), English cricketer

See also
 Samuel A. Weller (1851–1925), American pioneer pottery manufacturer